World Environment Day (WED) is celebrated annually on 5 June and encourages awareness and action for the protection of the environment. It is supported by many non-governmental organizations, businesses, government entities, and represents the primary United Nations outreach day supporting the environment. 

First held in 1973, it has been a platform for raising awareness on environmental issues  as marine pollution, overpopulation, global warming, sustainable development and wildlife crime. World Environment Day is a global platform for public outreach, with participation from over 143 countries annually. Each year, the program has provided a theme and forum for businesses, non government organizations, communities, governments and celebrities to advocate environmental causes.

History 
World Environment Day was established in 1972 by the United Nations at the Stockholm Conference on the Human Environment ( 5–16 June 1972), that had resulted from discussions on the integration of human interactions and the environment. One year later, in 1973 the first WED was held with the theme "Only One Earth".

Host cities 
World Environment Day celebrations have been (and will be) hosted in the following cities:

Annual themes and major initiatives and accomplishments 

For almost five decades(January 2016), World Environment Day has been raising awareness, supporting action, and driving changes for the environment. Here is a timeline of key accomplishments in WEDs' history:

2005

The theme for the 2005 World Environment Day was "Green Cities" and the slogan was "Plant for the Planet!".

2006
The topic for WED 2006 was Deserts and Desertification and the slogan was "Don't desert drylands".

The slogan emphasised the importance of protecting drylands. The main international celebrations of the World Environment Day 2006 were held in Algeria.

2007
The topic for World Environment Day for 2007 was "Melting Ice – a Hot Topic?" During International Polar Year, WED 2007 focused on the effects that climate change is having on polar ecosystems and communities, on other ice- and snow-covered areas of the world, and the resulting global impacts.

The main international celebrations of the WED 2007 were held in the city of Tromsø, Norway, a city north of the Arctic Circle.

Egypt issued a postage stamp for the 2007 World Environment Day.

2008
The host for World Environment Day 2008 was New Zealand, with the main international celebrations scheduled for Wellington. The slogan for 2008 was "CO2, Kick the Habit! Towards a Low Carbon Economy." New Zealand was one of the first countries to pledge to achieve carbon-neutrality, and will also focus on forest management as a tool for reducing greenhouse gases.

The Chicago Botanic Garden served as the North American host for World Environment Day on 5 June 2008.

2009
The theme for WED 2009 was 'Your Planet Needs You – UNite to Combat Climate Change', and Michael Jackson's 'Earth Song' was declared 'World Environment Day Song'. It was hosted in Mexico.

2010
'Many Species. One Planet. One Future', was the theme of 2010.

It celebrated the diversity of life on Earth as part of the 2010 International Year of Biodiversity. It was hosted in Rwanda. Thousands of activities were organized worldwide, with beach clean-ups, concerts, exhibits, film festivals, community events and much more. Each continent (except Antarctica) had a "regional host city", the U.N. chose Pittsburgh, Pennsylvania as the host for all North.

2011
The world environment day of 2011 was hosted by India. It was the 1st time for India to host the day. The theme for 2011 was 'ForestsNature At Your Service'. Thousands of activities were organized worldwide, with beach clean-ups, concerts, exhibits, film festivals, community events, tree plantings and much more.

2012
The theme for the 2012 World Environment Day was Green Economy.

The theme aimed to invite people to examine their activities and lifestyle and see how the concept of a "Green Economy" fits into it. The host country for the year's celebrations was Brazil.

2013

The 2013 theme for World Environment Day was Think.Eat.Save.

The campaign addressed the huge annual wastage and losses in food, which, if conserved, would release a large quantity of food as well as reduce the overall carbon footprint. The campaign aimed to bring about awareness in countries with lifestyles resulting in food wastage. It also aimed to empower people to make informed choices about the food they eat so as to reduce the overall ecological impact due to the worldwide production of food. The host country for the year's celebrations was Mongolia.

2014 
The Theme of the 2014 WED was International Year of Small Islands Developing States (SIDS). By choosing this Theme the UN General Assembly aimed to highlight the development Challenges and successes of the SIDS. In 2014, the World Environment Day focused on global warming and its impact on ocean levels. The Slogan of the WED 2014 is "Raise your voice not the sea level", as Barbados hosted the global celebrations of the 42nd edition of the World Environment Day. The UN Environment Programme named actor Ian Somerhalder as the official Goodwill ambassador of the WED 2014.

2015 
The Slogan of the 2015 edition of the World Environment Day is "Seven Billion Dreams. One Planet. Consume with Care". The slogan was picked through a voting process on social media. In Saudi Arabia, 15 women recycled 2000 plastic bags to crochet a mural in support of the WED 2015. In India, Narendra Modi planted a Kadamb sapling to celebrate the World Environment Day and raise awareness for Environment. Italy is the host country of the 43rd edition of the WED. The celebrations took place as part of Milan Expo around the theme: Feeding the Planet – Energy for Life.

2016 
The 2016 WED was organized under the theme "Go wild for life". This edition of the WED aims to reduce and prevent the illegal trade in wildlife. Angola was chosen as the host country of the 2016 WED during the COP21 in Paris.

2017
The theme for 2017 was 'Connecting People to Nature – in the city and on the land, from the poles to the equator'. The host nation was Canada.

2018
The theme for 2018 was "Beat Plastic Pollution". The host nation was India. By choosing this theme, it is hoped that people may strive to change their everyday lives to reduce the heavy burden of plastic pollution. People should be free from the over-reliance on single-use or disposables, as they have severe environmental consequences. We should liberate our natural places, our wildlife and our own health from plastics. The Indian government pledged to eliminate all single use of plastic in India by 2022.

2019
The theme for 2019 was "Beat Air Pollution". The host nation was China. This theme was chosen as air pollution kills about 7 million people annually.

In Réunion Island, Miss Earth 2018 Nguyễn Phương Khánh from Vietnam delivered her speech during World Environment Day with the theme "How to fight global warming".

2020 
The theme for 2020 was "Time for Nature", and was hosted in Colombia in partnership with Germany.

Colombia is one of the largest megadiverse countries in the world and holds close to 10% of the planet's biodiversity. Since it is part of the Amazon rainforest, Colombia ranks first in bird and orchid species diversity and second in plants, butterflies, freshwater fish, and amphibians.

2021 
The World Environment Day falls on June 5. The theme for 2021 is "Ecosystem Restoration", and was hosted by Pakistan. On this occasion UN Decade of Ecosystem Restoration was also launched.

2022 
The World Environment Day theme for 2022 is "Only One Earth" and the event was hosted by Sweden.

See also

 Arbor Day
 Earth Day
 National Cleanup Day
 World Cleanup Day
 Index of environmental articles
 List of environmental dates
 List of environmental protests
 United Nations Conference on the Human Environment

References

External links

World Environment Day 2019
2008, 2009
World Environment Day 2018 Theme

Environmental awareness days
Global natural environment
June observances
Recurring events established in 1973
United Nations days